The McCraney Limestone is a geologic formation in Illinois. It preserves low quality fossils dating back to the Carboniferous period.

See also

 List of fossiliferous stratigraphic units in Illinois

References
 

Carboniferous Iowa
Carboniferous Illinois
Carboniferous southern paleotemperate deposits
Carboniferous southern paleotropical deposits